Archidendropsis paivana is a species of flowering plant in the family Fabaceae. It is found only in New Caledonia. Its natural habitat is subtropical or tropical dry forests. It is threatened by habitat loss.

References

paivana
Endemic flora of New Caledonia
Vulnerable plants
Taxonomy articles created by Polbot